Odorrana anlungensis is a species of frog in the family Ranidae that is endemic to China: it is only known from its type locality, Mount Longtou in Anlong County, Guizhou. Its common name is Lungtou frog or Anlung odorous frog. Little is known about this species found in shaded hill streams 2-3m wide in forested areas.

References

anlungensis
Amphibians described in 1973
Amphibians of China
Endemic fauna of China
Taxonomy articles created by Polbot